Ripley is a neighborhood of Independence, Missouri, United States.

The community was named after a railroad official; an early variant name was Adams Station.

References

Independence, Missouri